Francisco Javier Toledo Rivera (30 September 1959 – 3 August 2006) was a Honduran football midfielder.

Club career
Toledo played for Marathón, Tela Timsa and Olimpia.

International career
Toledo represented his country in 18 FIFA World Cup qualification matches and was a non-playing squad member of Honduras' 1982 FIFA World Cup squad.

Death
Toledo died, aged only 46, in the Mario Catarino Rivas Hospital in San Pedro Sula after suffering a long illness. He was the second player of Honduras' 1982 World Cup squad to have died, after Domingo Drummond.

References

External links

1959 births
2006 deaths
People from Santa Bárbara Department, Honduras
Association football midfielders
Honduran footballers
Honduras international footballers
1982 FIFA World Cup players
C.D. Marathón players
C.D. Olimpia players